North American moths represent about 12,000 types of moths. In comparison, there are about 825 species of North American butterflies. The moths (mostly nocturnal) and butterflies (mostly diurnal) together make up the taxonomic order Lepidoptera.

This list is sorted by MONA number (MONA is short for Moths of America North of Mexico). A numbering system for North American moths introduced by Ronald W. Hodges, et al. in 1983 in the publication Check List of the Lepidoptera of America North of Mexico. The list has since been updated, but the placement in families is outdated for some species.

Former numbers for some species are given in square brackets, for example:

 3754 [3807] – Aethes angulatana

This list covers America north of Mexico (effectively the continental United States and Canada). For a list of moths and butterflies recorded from the state of Hawaii, see List of Lepidoptera of Hawaii.

This is a partial list, covering moths with MONA numbers ranging from 2701 to 3862. For the rest of the list, see List of moths of North America.

Tortricidae

Olethreutinae
2701 – Episimus argutana, sumac leaftier moth
2701.1 – Episimus guiana
2701.2 – Episimus transferrana
2702 – Episimus augmentana
2702.1 – Episimus burserae
2702.2 – Episimus kimballi
2702.3 – Episimus nesoites
2702.4 – Episimus lagunculariae
2703 – Episimus tyrius, maple tip borer moth
2704 – Cacocharis cymotoma
2704.1 – Cryptaspasma bipenicilla
2705 – Bactra lancealana, black-blotched bactra moth
2706 – Bactra furfurana
2707 – Bactra verutana, javelin moth
2707.1 – Bactra miwok
2708 – Bactra maiorina
2709 – Bactra priapeia
2710 – Bactra sinistra
2711 – Paralobesia liriodendrana, tulip-tree leaftier moth
2712 – Paralobesia viteana, grape berry moth
2713 – Paralobesia monotropana
2714 – Paralobesia sambuci
2715 – Paralobesia cypripediana
2716 – Paralobesia rhoifructana
2717 – Paralobesia yaracana
2718 – Paralobesia spiraeifoliana
2719 – Paralobesia exasperana
2720 – Paralobesia palliolana
2721 – Paralobesia piceana
2722 – Paralobesia aemulana
2723 – Paralobesia vernoniana
2724 – Paralobesia aruncana
2725 – Paralobesia slingerlandana
2726 – Paralobesia blandula
2727 – Paralobesia cyclopiana
2728 – Lobesia carduana
2729 – Lobesia bicinctana
2729.1 – Lobesia botrana, European grapevine moth
2730 – Ahmosia galbinea
2731 – Ahmosia aspasiana
2732 – Endothenia montanana
2733 – Endothenia heinrichi
2734 – Endothenia rubipunctana
2735 – Endothenia sordulenta
2736 – Endothenia melanosticta
2737 – Endothenia affiliana
2738 – Endothenia hebesana, verbena bud moth
2740 – Endothenia conditana
2741 – Endothenia microptera
2742 – Endothenia infuscata
2743 – Endothenia nubilana
2744 – Endothenia gentianaeana
2745 – Taniva albolineana, spruce needleminer moth
2746 – Tia enervana
2747 – Hulda impudens
2748 – Aterpia approximana, sparkling aterpia moth
2749 – Eumarozia malachitana, sculptured moth
2750 – Zomaria interruptolineana, broken-line zomaria moth
2751 – Zomaria rosaochreana
2752 – Zomaria andromedana, andromedana moth
2753 – Apotomis capreana, sallow apotomis moth
2754 – Apotomis paludicolana
2755 – Apotomis funerea, funereal apotomis moth
2756 – Apotomis frigidana
2757 – Apotomis spinulana
2757.1 – Apotomis trifida
2758 – Apotomis brevicornutana
2759 – Apotomis tertiana
2760 – Apotomis bifida
2761 – Apotomis afficticia
2763 – Apotomis albeolana
2764 – Apotomis apateticana
2765 – Apotomis deceptana, deceptive apotomis moth
2765.1 – Apotomis coloradensis
2767 – Apotomis infida
2767.1 – Apotomis spurinfida
2768 – Apotomis removana, green aspen leafroller moth
2769 – Pseudosciaphila duplex, poplar leafroller moth
2770 – Orthotaenia undulana, dusky leafroller moth
2771 – Phaecasiophora confixana, macramé moth
2772 – Phaecasiophora niveiguttana, labyrinth moth
2773 – Phaecasiophora inspersa
2774 – Olethreutes monetiferanum
2775 – Olethreutes nitidana
2776 – Olethreutes furfuranum, woolly-backed moth
2777 – Olethreutes comandranum
2778 – Olethreutes olivaceana, olivaceous olethreutes moth
2779 – Olethreutes fraternanum
2780 – Olethreutes subnubilum
2781 – Olethreutes electrofuscum
2782 – Olethreutes rusticanum
2783 – Olethreutes diallacta
2784 – Olethreutes footiana
2785 – Olethreutes atrodentana
2786 – Olethreutes punctanum
2787 – Olethreutes connectum, bunchberry leaffolder moth
2788 – Olethreutes inornatana, inornate olethreutes moth
2790 – Olethreutes mediopartitum
2791 – Olethreutes exoletum, wretched olethreutes moth
2792 – Olethreutes bicoloranum
2793 – Olethreutes tenebricum
2794 – Olethreutes quadrifidum
2795 – Olethreutes tilianum, basswood olethreutes moth
2796 – Olethreutes sciotana
2797 – Olethreutes appalachiana
2799 – Olethreutes clavana
2799.1 – Olethreutes mysteriana, mysterious olethreutes moth
2800 – Olethreutes nigranum, variable nigranum moth
2801 – Olethreutes viburnanum
2802 – Olethreutes hippocastanum
2803 – Olethreutes merrickanum
2804 – Olethreutes hamameliana
2805 – Olethreutes corylana
2806 – Olethreutes ochrosuffusanum
2807 – Olethreutes brunneopurpurata
2808 – Olethreutes ferrugineanum
2809 – Olethreutes fagigemmeana
2810 – Olethreutes sericoranum
2811 – Olethreutes melanomesum
2812 – Olethreutes valdanum
2813 – Olethreutes baccatana
2814 – Olethreutes versicolorana
2815 – Olethreutes brevirostratum
2816 – Olethreutes galevora
2817 – Olethreutes permundana, raspberry leafroller moth
2818 – Olethreutes submissanum
2819 – Olethreutes nananum
2820 – Olethreutes malana, Malana leafroller moth
2821 – Olethreutes appendiceum, serviceberry leafroller moth
2822 – Olethreutes concinnana
2823 – Olethreutes fasciatana
2824 – Olethreutes troglodanum
2825 – Olethreutes exaeresimum
2826 – Olethreutes lacunana, lacuna moth
2827 – Olethreutes ferriferana, hydrangea leaftier moth
2828 – Olethreutes griseoalbana, putty-patched moth
2829 – Olethreutes osmundana
2830 – Olethreutes auricapitana
2831 – Pristerognatha fuligana
2831.1 – Argyroploce dalecarlianus
2831.2 – Argyroploce aquilonanus
2832 – Olethreutes albiciliana
2833 – Olethreutes siderana
2834 – Olethreutes sordidana
2835 – Olethreutes galaxana
2837 – Olethreutes astrologana, the astronomer moth
2838 – Olethreutes coruscana
2838.1 – Olethreutes ferrolineana
2839 – Olethreutes metallicana
2840 – Olethreutes nordeggana
2842 – Olethreutes heinrichana
2843 – Olethreutes minaki
2844 – Olethreutes deprecatorius
2845 – Olethreutes carolana
2846 – Olethreutes polluxana
2847 – Olethreutes glaciana
2848 – Olethreutes bipartitana, divided olethreutes moth
2849 – Olethreutes trinitana
2850 – Olethreutes schulziana, moorland olethreutes moth
2851 – Olethreutes turfosana
2852 – Olethreutes septentrionana
2853 – Olethreutes inquietana
2854 – Olethreutes bowmanana
2855 – Olethreutes mengelana
2856 – Olethreutes costimaculana
2857 – Olethreutes devotana
2858 – Olethreutes buckellana
2858.1 – Olethreutes exaridanus
2858.2 – Olethreutes palustrana
2858.3 – Selenodes concretana
2859 – Celypha cespitana, celypha moth
2860 – Metendothenia separatana, pink-washed leafroller moth
2860.1 – Metendothenia atropunctana
2861 – Hedya ochroleucana, off-white hedya moth
2862 – Hedya nubiferana, green budworm moth
2863 – Hedya chionosema, white-spotted hedya moth
2864 – Hedya cyanana
2864.1 – Hedya salicella
2865 – Tsinilla lineana
2866 – Evora hemidesma, spirea leaftier moth
2867 – Rhyacionia buoliana, European pine shoot moth
2868 – Rhyacionia rigidana, pitch pine tip moth
2869 – Rhyacionia subtropica, subtropical pine tip moth
2870 – Rhyacionia multilineata
2871 – Rhyacionia pasadenana
2872 – Rhyacionia zozana
2873 – Rhyacionia neomexicana
2874 – Rhyacionia salmonicolor
2875 – Rhyacionia monophylliana
2876 – Rhyacionia martinana
2877 – Rhyacionia adana, Adana pine tip moth
2878 – Rhyacionia jenningsi
2879 – Rhyacionia busckana, red pine tip moth
2879.1 – Rhyacionia granti, jack pine tip moth
2880 – Rhyacionia blanchardi
2881 – Rhyacionia fumosana
2882 – Rhyacionia frustrana, Nantucket pine tip moth
2883 – Rhyacionia bushnelli
2884 – Rhyacionia sonia, yellow jack pine tip moth
2885 – Rhyacionia aktita
2886 – Rhyacionia subcervinana
2887 – Rhyacionia pallifasciata
2887.1 – Rhyacionia duplana
2888 – Rhyacionia versicolor
2888.2 – Jerapowellia burnsorum
2889 – Retinia comstockiana, pitch twig moth
2890 – Retinia taedana, southern pitch-blister moth
2891 – Retinia wenzeli, Wenzel's pitch-blister moth
2892 – Retinia albicapitana, northern pitch twig moth
2893 – Retinia arizonensis
2894 – Retinia metallica
2896 – Retinia sabiniana
2897 – Retinia edemoidana
2898 – Retinia gemistrigulana
2898.1 – Retinia mafica
2899 – Retinia pallipennis
2900 – Retinia burkeana
2901 – Retinia picicolana
2902 – Retinia houseri, minute pitch-blister moth
2903 – Barbara colfaxiana, Douglas-fir cone moth
2904 – Barbara ulteriorana
2905 – Barbara mappana
2906 – Spilonota ocellana, eye-spotted bud moth
2907 – Strepsicrates smithiana, bayberry leaftier moth
2908 – Phaneta radiatana
2909 – Phaneta albertana
2910 – Phaneta essexana, Essex phaneta moth
2911 – Phaneta awemeana
2912 – Phaneta indeterminana
2913 – Phaneta umbrastriana
2915 – Phaneta ferruginana, ferruginous phaneta moth
2916 – Phaneta formosana, beautiful phaneta moth
2917 – Phaneta altana
2918 – Phaneta corculana
2919 – Phaneta annetteana
2920 – Phaneta scotiana
2921 – Phaneta citricolorana
2922 – Phaneta amphorana
2923 – Phaneta decempunctana
2924 – Phaneta refusana
2925 – Phaneta autumnana
2926 – Phaneta verna, speckled phaneta moth
2927 – Phaneta ochrocephala, pale-headed phaneta moth
2928 – Phaneta raracana, reddish phaneta moth
2929 – Phaneta ochroterminana, buff-tipped phaneta moth
2933 – Phaneta marmontana
2935 – Phaneta oregonensis
2936 – Phaneta tomonana, aster-head phaneta moth
2937 – Phaneta parmatana
2938 – Phaneta modernana
2939 – Phaneta fasciculatana
2940 – Phaneta convergana
2941 – Phaneta mormonensis
2942 – Phaneta delphinus
2943 – Phaneta latens
2944 – Phaneta columbiana
2944.1 – Phaneta mayelisana
2945 – Phaneta insignata
2946 – Phaneta apacheana
2947 – Phaneta influana
2947.1 – Phaneta musetta
2948 – Phaneta sublapidana
2949 – Phaneta lapidana
2950 – Phaneta kokana
2951 – Phaneta ornatula
2952 – Phaneta elongana
2953 – Phaneta rupestrana
2954 – Phaneta vernalana
2955 – Phaneta transversa
2956 – Phaneta tarandana
2957 – Phaneta nepotinana
2958 – Phaneta complicana
2959 – Phaneta spectana
2960 – Phaneta tenuiana
2961 – Phaneta migratana
2962 – Phaneta cinereolineana
2963 – Phaneta misturana
2964 – Phaneta parvana
2965 – Phaneta fertoriana
2966 – Phaneta crassana
2967 – Phaneta alatana
2968 – Phaneta clavana, striped phaneta moth
2969 – Phaneta indagatricana
2969.1 – Phaneta verecundana
2970 – Phaneta argenticostana
2971 – Phaneta spiculana
2972 – Phaneta dorsiatomana
2973 – Phaneta striatana, striated phaneta moth
2974 – Phaneta implicata
2975 – Phaneta delphinoides
2976 – Phaneta pallidarcis
2977 – Phaneta modicellana
2978 – Phaneta minimana
2979 – Phaneta subminimana
2980 – Phaneta pallidicostana
2981 – Phaneta perangustana
2982 – Phaneta kiscana
2983 – Phaneta salmicolorana
2984 – Phaneta artemisiana
2985 – Phaneta infimbriana
2986 – Phaneta octopunctana
2987 – Phaneta youngi
2988 – Phaneta setonana
2989 – Phaneta scalana
2990 – Phaneta festivana
2991 – Phaneta segregata
2992 – Phaneta castrensis
2993 – Phaneta camdenana
2994 – Phaneta montanana
2995 – Phaneta benjamini
2996 – Phaneta griseocapitana
2996.1 – Phaneta cruentana
2997 – Phaneta pastigiata
2998 – Phaneta olivaceana, olivaceous phaneta moth
2999 – Phaneta verniochreana
3001 – Phaneta granulatana
3002 – Phaneta grindeliana
3002.1 – Phaneta clarkei
3003 – Phaneta stramineana
3004 – Phaneta umbraticana
3004.1 – Phaneta ambodaidaleia
3004.2 – Phaneta canusana
3005 – Phaneta offectalis
3005.1 – Phaneta argutipunctana, coastal phaneta moth
3005.2 – Phaneta linitipunctana, sand dune phaneta moth
3006 – Phaneta bucephaloides
3007 – Phaneta southamptonensis
3008 – Eucosma quinquemaculana, five-spotted eucosma moth
3009 – Eucosma robinsonana, Robinson's eucosma moth
3009.1 – Eucosma fritillana
3009.2 – Eucosma guttulana, speckled eucosma moth
3010 – Eucosma hazelana
3011 – Eucosma crambitana
3011.1 – Eucosma aurilineana
3012 – Eucosma fandana
3013 – Eucosma canariana
3014 – Eucosma ridingsana, snakeweed borer moth
3014.1 – Eucosma griselda
3015 – Eucosma fernaldana, Fernald's eucosma moth
3016 – Eucosma betana
3017 – Eucosma magnidicana
3018 – Eucosma caniceps
3020 – Eucosma avalona
3021 – Eucosma adamantana
3022 – Eucosma spaldingana
3023 – Eucosma sandiego
3023.1 – Eucosma atacosana
3024 – Eucosma gilletteana
3025 – Eucosma optimana
3026 – Eucosma aemulana
3027 – Eucosma laticurva
3028 – Eucosma dapsilis
3029 – Eucosma bolanderana
3030 – Eucosma ragonoti
3031 – Eucosma serpentana
3032 – Eucosma ophionana
3033 – Eucosma heathiana
3034 – Eucosma langstoni
3035 – Eucosma morrisoni
3036 – Eucosma lathami, Latham's eucosma moth
3037 – Eucosma agricolana
3038 – Eucosma smithiana
3039 – Eucosma barbara
3040 – Eucosma costastrigulana
3041 – Eucosma comatulana
3041.1 – Eucosma pediasios
3041.2 – Eucosma rindgei
3041.3 – Eucosma austrina
3042 – Eucosma vagana
3043 – Eucosma albiguttana
3044 – Eucosma graciliana
3045 – Eucosma galenapunctana
3046 – Eucosma monogrammana
3047 – Eucosma atomosana
3049 – Eucosma serapicana
3050 – Eucosma watertonana
3051 – Eucosma glomerana
3052 – Eucosma circulana
3053 – Eucosma fraudabilis
3054.1 – Eucosma kandana
3055 – Eucosma louisana
3056 – Eucosma russeola
3057 – Eucosma luridana
3058 – Eucosma consociana
3059 – Eucosma irroratana
3060 – Eucosma subflavana
3061 – Eucosma handana
3061.1 – Eucosma curlewensis
3063 – Eucosma immaculana
3064 – Eucosma maculatana
3065 – Eucosma sonomana, western pine shoot borer moth
3066 – Eucosma gloriola, eastern pine shoot borer moth
3067 – Eucosma bobana
3068 – Eucosma ponderosa
3069 – Eucosma monoensis
3070 – Eucosma franclemonti
3071 – Eucosma recissoriana, lodgepole pinecone borer moth
3072 – Eucosma cocana, shortleaf pinecone borer moth
3073 – Eucosma monitorana, red pinecone borer moth
3074 – Eucosma tocullionana, white pinecone borer moth
3075 – Eucosma siskiyouana, fir cone borer moth
3076 – Eucosma crymalana
3077 – Eucosma momana
3079 – Eucosma palabundana
3080 – Eucosma lolana
3081 – Eucosma dodana
3082 – Eucosma fofana
3083 – Eucosma invicta
3085 – Eucosma eburata
3086 – Eucosma subinvicta
3087 – Eucosma snyderana
3089 – Eucosma totana
3089.1 – Eucosma piperata
3089.2 – Eucosma nordini
3089.3 – Eucosma taosana
3090 – Eucosma persolita
3091 – Eucosma matutina
3091.1 – Eucosma notialis
3092 – Eucosma larana
3093 – Eucosma exclusoriana
3094 – Eucosma heinrichi
3095 – Eucosma shastana
3096 – Eucosma grandiflavana
3097 – Eucosma hyponomeutana
3098 – Eucosma giganteana, giant eucosma moth
3099 – Eucosma bipunctella
3100 – Eucosma bilineana
3101 – Eucosma denverana
3102 – Eucosma williamsi
3103 – Eucosma graziella
3104 – Pelochrista mediostriata
3105 – Eucosma excerptionana
3106 – Eucosma abstemia
3107 – Eucosma biplagata
3108 – Eucosma primulana
3109 – Eucosma hasseanthi
3110 – Eucosma gomonana
3111 – Eucosma dilatana
3112 – Eucosma nandana
3113 – Eucosma aprilana
3114 – Eucosma landana
3115 – Eucosma simplex
3116 – Eucosma dorsisignatana, triangle-backed eucosma moth
3116.1 – Eucosma similiana
3117 – Eucosma hennei
3118 – Eucosma graduatana
3119 – Eucosma juncticiliana
3120 – Eucosma derelicta, derelict eucosma moth
3121 – Eucosma excusabilis
3122 – Eucosma wandana
3124 – Eucosma fulminana
3125 – Eucosma rusticana
3125.1 – Eucosma haydenae
3126 – Eucosma mobilensis
3127 – Eucosma sombreana
3128 – Eucosma pandana
3129 – Eucosma fiskeana
3130 – Eucosma nuntia
3131 – Eucosma inquadrana
3132 – Eucosma pulveratana
3133 – Eucosma consobrinana
3134 – Eucosma aspidana
3135 – Eucosma hohana
3136 – Eucosma jejunana
3137 – Eucosma biquadrana
3138 – Eucosma microsignata
3138.1 – Eucosma sierrae
3138.2 – Eucosma diabolana
3139 – Eucosma suadana
3140 – Eucosma aeana
3141 – Eucosma canana
3142 – Eucosma cataclystiana, solidaga eucosma moth
3143 – Eucosma conspiciendana
3144 – Eucosma floridana
3145 – Eucosma fuscana
3146 – Eucosma liturana
3147 – Eucosma petalonota
3148 – Eucosma urnigera
3148.1 – Eucosma salaciana
3148.2 – Eucosma rosaocellana
3149 – Pelochrista argenteana
3149.1 – Pelochrista gelattana
3151 – Pelochrista scintillana
3152 – Pelochrista fratruelis
3153 – Pelochrista pallidipalpana
3154 – Pelochrista popana
3155 – Pelochrista daemonicana
3156 – Eucosma occipitana
3157 – Pelochrista reversana
3157.1 – Pelochrista ainsliei
3157.2 – Pelochrista kingi
3158 – Pelochrista emaciatana
3160 – Pelochrista palpana
3160.1 – Pelochrista gilligani
3161 – Pelochrista fuscosparsa
3161.1 – Pelochrista fuscostriata
3161.2 – Pelochrista collilonga
3162 – Pelochrista corosana
3164 – Pelochrista expolitana
3165 – Pelochrista rorana
3166 – Pelochrista metariana
3167 – Pelochrista passerana
3168 – Pelochrista zomonana
3169 – Pelochrista womonana
3170 – Pelochrista vandana
3170.1 – Pelochrista powelli
3170.2 – Pelochrista milleri
3170.3 – Pelochrista medullana
3171 – Epiblema boxcana
3172 – Epiblema strenuana, ragweed borer moth
3173 – Epiblema abruptana, abrupt epiblema moth
3174 – Epiblema numerosana
3174.1 – Epiblema luctuosissima
3174.2 – Epiblema chromata
3175 – Epiblema grossbecki
3176 – Epiblema praesumptiosa, presumed epiblema moth
3177 – Epiblema separationis
3178 – Epiblema deflexana
3179 – Epiblema ochraceana
3180 – Epiblema sosana
3181 – Epiblema insidiosana
3182 – Epiblema symbolaspis
3183 – Epiblema exacerbatricana
3184 – Epiblema tripartitana
3184.1 – Epiblema glenni
3185 – Epiblema benignatum
3186 – Epiblema scudderiana, goldenrod gall moth
3188 – Epiblema discretivana, epiblema species group
3189 – Epiblema obfuscana
3190 – Epiblema desertana
3191 – Epiblema rudei
3192 – Epiblema carolinana, gray-blotched epiblema moth
3193 – Epiblema arizonana
3194 – Epiblema hirsutana
3194.1 – Epiblema deverrae
3195 – Epiblema radicana
3196 – Epiblema walsinghami
3197 – Epiblema periculosana
3198 – Epiblema iowana
3200 – Epiblema lyallana
3200.1 – Epiblema simploniana
3201 – Epiblema infelix
3202 – Epiblema otiosana, bidens borer moth
3203 – Epiblema brightonana, Brighton's epiblema moth
3204 – Epiblema tandana
3205 – Epiblema resumptana
3206 – Epiblema dorsisuffusana
3207 – Epiblema macneilli
3207.2 – Epiblema gibsoni
3208 – Notocelia rosaecolana, Doubleday's notocelia moth
3208.1 – Notocelia cynosbatella
3209 – Notocelia purpurissatana
3210 – Notocelia illotana
3211 – Notocelia culminana
3212 – Suleima helianthana, sunflower bud moth
3213 – Suleima daracana
3214 – Suleima skinnerana
3215 – Suleima lagopana
3216 – Suleima baracana
3217 – Suleima cinerodorsana
3217.1 – Suleima mendaciana
3218 – Sonia constrictana, constricted sonia moth
3218.1 – Sonia paraplesiana, Hebrew sonia moth
3219 – Sonia canadana, Canadian sonia moth
3220 – Sonia vovana
3221 – Sonia comstocki
3222 – Sonia filiana
3222.1 – Sonia divaricata
3223 – Gypsonoma fasciolana
3224 – Gypsonoma nebulosana
3225 – Gypsonoma parryana
3226 – Gypsonoma haimbachiana, cottonwood twig borer moth
3227 – Gypsonoma substitutionis
3228 – Gypsonoma salicicolana
3229 – Gypsonoma adjuncta
3229.1 – Gypsonoma nitidulana
3229.2 – Gypsonoma aceriana, European poplar shoot borer moth
3230 – Proteoteras aesculana, maple twig borer moth
3231 – Proteoteras implicatum
3232 – Proteoteras willingana, eastern boxelder twig borer moth
3233 – Proteoteras crescentana, northern boxelder twig borer moth
3234 – Proteoteras naracana
3235 – Proteoteras moffatiana, maple bud borer moth
3236 – Proteoteras arizonae, western boxelder twig borer moth
3237 – Proteoteras obnigrana
3238 – Zeiraphera claypoleana, buckeye petiole borer moth
3239 – Zeiraphera pacifica
3240 – Zeiraphera canadensis, spruce bud moth
3241 – Zeiraphera improbana, larch needleworm moth
3242 – Zeiraphera fortunana, yellow spruce budworm moth
3243 – Zeiraphera unfortunana, purple-striped shootworm moth
3244 – Zeiraphera hesperiana
3245 – Zeiraphera vancouverana
3246 – Pseudexentera cressoniana, shagbark hickory leafroller moth
3247 – Pseudexentera mali, pale apple leafroller moth
3248 – Pseudexentera oregonana
3250 – Pseudexentera senatrix
3251 – Pseudexentera spoliana, bare-patched leafroller moth
3252 – Pseudexentera haracana
3252.1 – Pseudexentera sepia
3252.2 – Pseudexentera oreios
3253 – Pseudexentera faracana
3253.3 – Pseudexentera knudsoni
3254 – Pseudexentera maracana
3254.1 – Pseudexentera vaccinii
3255 – Pseudexentera kalmiana
3256 – Pseudexentera habrosana
3257 – Pseudexentera costomaculana
3257.1 – Pseudexentera hodsoni
3258 – Pseudexentera virginiana
3259 – Gretchena deludana, arrowhead moth
3260 – Gretchena concubitana
3261 – Gretchena watchungana
3262 – Gretchena dulciana
3263 – Gretchena bolliana, pecan bud moth
3264 – Gretchena amatana
3265 – Gretchena delicatana, ironwood fruitworm moth
3266 – Gretchena obsoletana
3266.1 – Gretchena nymphana
3267 – Gretchena semialba
3268 – Gretchena concitatricana
3269 – Epinotia radicana, red-striped needleworm moth
3270 – Chimoptesis chrysopyla
3271 – Chimoptesis matheri
3272 – Chimoptesis gerulae
3273 – Chimoptesis pennsylvaniana, filigreed moth
3274 – Crocidosema plebejana, cotton tipworm moth
3274.1 – Crocidosema lantana
3274.2 – Crocidosema longipalpana
3274.3 – Crocidosema unica
3274.4 – Crocidosema aporema
3274.5 – Crocidosema litchivora, litchi bud moth
3275 – Hendecaneura shawiana, blueberry tip borer moth
3276 – Rhopobota naevana, holly tortrix moth
3277 – Rhopobota dietziana
3278 – Rhopobota finitimana
3280 – Epinotia trigonella, birch epinotia moth
3281 – Epinotia sperana
3282 – Epinotia myricana
3283 – Epinotia solandriana, birch-aspen leafroller moth
3283.1 – Epinotia abbreviana
3284 – Epinotia ethnica
3285 – Epinotia pulsatillana
3285.1 – Epinotia siskiyouensis
3286 – Epinotia medioviridana, raspberry leaf-roller moth
3287 – Epinotia perplexana
3288 – Epinotia castaneana
3289 – Epinotia johnsonana
3290 – Epinotia madderana, white lace epinotia moth
3291 – Epinotia celtisana
3291.1 – Epinotia sotipena, black dash epinotia moth
3292 – Epinotia vertumnana
3292.1 – Epinotia celtisana
3294 – Epinotia zandana
3295 – Epinotia xandana
3296 – Epinotia albicapitana
3297 – Epinotia hopkinsana
3298 – Epinotia subviridis
3299 – Epinotia fumoviridana
3300 – Epinotia subplicana
3301 – Epinotia improvisana
3302 – Epinotia rectiplicana
3303 – Epinotia corylana
3304 – Epinotia solicitana, birch shoot borer moth
3305 – Epinotia hamptonana
3306 – Epinotia nisella, poplar branchlet borer moth
3307 – Epinotia criddleana
3308 – Epinotia albangulana
3309 – Epinotia walkerana
3310 – Epinotia transmissana, Walker's epinotia moth
3311 – Epinotia removana
3312 – Epinotia momonana
3313 – Epinotia terracoctana
3314 – Epinotia miscana
3315 – Epinotia silvertoniensis
3315.1 – Epinotia huroniensis
3317 – Epinotia digitana
3318 – Epinotia nigralbanoidana
3319 – Epinotia nigralbana
3320 – Epinotia ruidosana
3321 – Epinotia heucherana
3322 – Epinotia sagittana
3323 – Epinotia emarginana
3324 – Epinotia crenana
3324.1 – Epinotia columbia
3325 – Epinotia cercocarpana
3326 – Epinotia bigemina
3327 – Epinotia bicordana
3328 – Epinotia arctostaphylana
3329 – Epinotia keiferana
3331 – Epinotia infuscana
3333 – Catastega timidella, oak trumpet skeletonizer moth
3333.1 – Catastega spectra
3333.2 – Catastega nebula
3333.3 – Catastega strigatella
3333.4 – Catastega triangulana
3333.5 – Catastega adobe
3333.6 – Catastega plicata
3334 – Catastega aceriella, maple trumpet skeletonizer moth
3334.1 – Catastega marmoreana
3335 – Epinotia nonana
3336 – Epinotia normanana
3337 – Epinotia balsameae
3338 – Epinotia nanana, European spruce needleminer moth
3339 – Epinotia tsugana, hemlock needleminer moth
3340 – Epinotia meritana, white fir needleminer moth
3341 – Epinotia aridos
3342 – Epinotia lomonana
3343 – Epinotia purpuriciliana
3344 – Epinotia medioplagata
3345 – Epinotia cruciana, willow tortrix moth
3346 – Epinotia plumbolineana
3347 – Epinotia septemberana
3348 – Epinotia vagana
3349 – Epinotia seorsa
3350 – Epinotia kasloana
3350.1 – Epinotia signiferana
3351 – Epinotia lindana, diamondback epinotia moth
3352 – Epinotia trossulana
3353 – Epinotia biangulana
3354 – Ancylis nubeculana, little cloud ancylis moth
3355 – Ancylis subaequana
3356 – Ancylis galeamatana
3357 – Ancylis sheppardana
3358 – Ancylis discigerana, yellow birch leaffolder moth
3359 – Ancylis metamelana, black-marked ancylis moth
3360 – Ancylis tenebrica
3361 – Ancylis semiovana
3362 – Ancylis columbiana
3363 – Ancylis simuloides
3364 – Ancylis maritima
3365 – Ancylis spireaefoliana
3366 – Ancylis laciniana
3367 – Ancylis burgessiana, oak leaffolder moth
3368 – Ancylis mira
3369 – Ancylis fuscociliana
3370 – Ancylis platanana
3371 – Ancylis rhoderana
3372 – Ancylis brauni
3373 – Ancylis definitivana
3374 – Ancylis comptana, strawberry leafroller moth
3375 – Ancylis divisana, two-toned ancylis moth
3376 – Ancylis apicana
3377 – Ancylis muricana, red-headed ancylis moth
3378 – Ancylis carbonana
3379 – Ancylis diminutana
3380 – Ancylis goodelliana
3381 – Ancylis albafascia
3382 – Ancylis unguicella
3383 – Ancylis pacificana
3384 – Ancylis mediofasciana
3385 – Ancylis torontana
3386 – Ancylis tineana
3387 – Ancylis albacostana, white-edged ancylis moth
3388 – Ancylis cordiae
3388.1 – Ancylis geminana
3389 – Hystrichophora leonana
3390 – Hystrichophora paradisiae
3391 – Hystrichophora stygiana
3392 – Hystrichophora roessleri
3393 – Hystrichophora ostentatrix
3395 – Hystrichophora taleana, indigobush twig borer moth
3396 – Hystrichophora ochreicostana
3397 – Hystrichophora loricana
3398 – Hystrichophora decorosa
3399 – Hystrichophora vestaliana
3399.1 – Eucosmomorpha albersana
3399.2 – Eucosmomorpha nearctica
3399.3 – Enarmonia formosana, cherry bark tortrix moth
3400 – Goditha bumeliana
3400.1 – Riculorampha ancyloides
3404 – Dichrorampha simulana
3406 – Dichrorampha bittana
3407 – Dichrorampha incanana
3408 – Dichrorampha vancouverana, tanacetum root moth
3409 – Dichrorampha radicicolana
3410 – Dichrorampha banana
3411 – Dichrorampha piperana
3412 – Dichrorampha sedatana
3413 – Dichrorampha dana
3414 – Dichrorampha leopardana
3414.1 – Dichrorampha sapodilla, sapodilla pod borer moth
3414.2 – Dichrorampha manilkara
3414.3 – Dichrorampha broui
3414.4 – Dichrorampha petiverella
3415 – Satronia tantilla, southern pine catkinworm moth
3416 – Ricula maculana
3417 – Talponia plummeriana, speckled talponia moth
3418 – Pammene ocliferia
3419 – Pammene felicitana
3420 – Pammene perstructana
3421 – Pammene paula
3422 – Pammene bowmanana
3422.1 – Pammene medioalbana
3423 – Larisa subsolana
3424 – Ethelgoda texanana
3425 – Sereda tautana, speckled sereda moth
3426 – Grapholita molesta, Oriental fruit moth
3427 – Grapholita libertina
3428 – Grapholita packardi, cherry fruitworm moth
3429 – Grapholita prunivora, lesser appleworm moth
3430 – Grapholita angeleseana
3431 – Grapholita caeruleana
3432 – Grapholita boulderana
3433 – Grapholita vitrana
3434 – Grapholita fana
3435 – Grapholita conversana
3436 – Grapholita imitativa
3437 – Grapholita lunatana
3438 – Grapholita eclipsana, solidago root moth
3439 – Grapholita interstinctana, clover head caterpillar moth
3440 – Grapholita edwardsiana
3441 – Grapholita lana
3441.1 – Grapholita hieroglyphana
3442 – Grapholita dyarana
3443 – Grapholita tristrigana, three-lined grapholita moth
3443.1 – Grapholita delineana, Eurasian hemp moth
3444 – Ofatulena duodecemstriata
3445 – Ofatulena luminosa
3446 – Corticivora clarki
3446.1 – Corticivora chica
3446.2 – Corticivora parva
3447 – Cydia coniferana
3448 – Cydia bracteatana
3449 – Cydia laricana
3450 – Cydia rana
3452 – Cydia inopiosa
3453 – Cydia confusana
3454 – Cydia obnisa
3455 – Cydia strobilella, spruce seed moth
3455.1 – Cydia phyllisi
3456 – Cydia larimana
3457 – Cydia garacana
3458 – Cydia membrosa
3459 – Cydia multilineana
3460 – Cydia ingrata
3461 – Cydia albimaculana, white-marked cydia moth
3462 – Cydia palmetum
3463 – Cydia populana
3464 – Cydia lacustrina
3465 – Cydia flexiloqua
3467 – Cydia nigricana, pea moth
3469 – Cydia candana
3470 – Cydia grandicula
3471 – Cydia caryana, hickory shuckworm moth
3472 – Cydia fletcherana, Fletcher's cydia moth
3473 – Cydia pseudotsugae
3474 – Cydia tana
3475 – Cydia cupressana
3476 – Cydia prosperana
3477 – Cydia costastrigulana
3478 – Cydia leucobasis
3479 – Cydia gallaesaliciana, willow gall moth
3480 – Cydia lautiuscula
3481 – Cydia americana
3482 – Cydia fahlbergiana
3483 – Cydia ninana
3484 – Cydia colorana
3485 – Cydia erotella
3486 – Cydia toreuta, eastern pine seedworm moth
3487 – Cydia ingens, longleaf pine seedworm moth
3488 – Cydia anaranjada, slash pine seedworm moth
3489 – Cydia piperana, ponderosa pine seedworm moth
3489.1 – Cydia montezuma
3490 – Cydia miscitata
3490.1 – Cydia latisigna
3491 – Cydia injectiva
3492 – Cydia pomonella, codling moth
3493 – Cydia saltitans (formerly deshaisiana, a nomen nudum) Mexican jumping bean moth
3493.1 – Cydia largo
3494 – Cydia latiferreana, filbertworm moth
3495 – Gymnandrosoma punctidiscanum, dotted ecdytolopha moth
3495.1 – Ecdytolopha coloradana
3495.2 – Ecdytolopha occidentana
3496 – Gymnandrosoma desotanum
3497 – Ecdytolopha insiticiana, locust twig borer moth
3498 – Ecdytolopha mana
3500 – Pseudogalleria inimicella, inimical borer moth

Tortricinae
3501 – Acleris forskaleana, maple leaftier moth
3502 – Acleris albicomana, red-edged acleris moth
3503 – Acleris semipurpurana, oak leaftier moth
3504 – Acleris curvalana, blueberry leaftier moth
3505 – Acleris holmiana, golden leafroller moth
3506 – Acleris macdunnoughi
3507 – Acleris comariana, strawberry tortrix moth
3508 – Acleris caliginosana
3509 – Acleris ptychogrammos
3510 – Acleris nivisellana, snowy-shouldered acleris moth
3511 – Acleris rhombana, rhomboid tortrix moth
3512 – Acleris notana
3513 – Acleris caryosphena
3514 – Acleris cervinana
3515 – Acleris santacrucis
3516 – Acleris comandrana
3517 – Acleris subnivana
3518 – Acleris braunana
3519 – Acleris kearfottana
3520 – Acleris fuscana, small aspen leaftier moth
3521 – Acleris semiannula
3521.1 – Acleris stadiana
3521.2 – Acleris ferrugana
3522 – Acleris implexana
3523 – Acleris cornana
3524 – Acleris simpliciana
3525 – Acleris forbesana, Forbes' acleris moth
3526 – Acleris negundana, speckled acleris moth
3527 – Acleris schalleriana, Schaller's acleris moth
3528 – Acleris okanagana
3529 – Acleris oxycoccana
3530 – Acleris variegana, garden rose tortrix moth
3531 – Acleris hastiana
3532 – Acleris fragariana
3533 – Acleris celiana
3534 – Acleris arcticana
3535 – Acleris keiferi
3536 – Acleris robinsoniana, Robinson's acleris moth
3537 – Acleris britannia, Brittania moth
3538 – Acleris klotsi
3539 – Acleris chalybeana, lesser maple leafroller moth
3540 – Acleris logiana, black-headed birch leaffolder moth
3541 – Acleris senescens
3542 – Acleris flavivittana, multiform leafroller moth
3543 – Acleris maculidorsana, stained-back leafroller moth
3544 – Acleris clarkei
3545 – Acleris minuta, yellowheaded fireworm moth
3546 – Acleris paracinderella
3547 – Acleris gloveranus, western black-headed budworm moth
3548 – Acleris variana, eastern black-headed budworm moth
3549 – Acleris maccana
3550 – Acleris youngana
3551 – Acleris inana
3552 – Acleris scabrana, gray rough-wing moth
3553 – Acleris bowmanana
3554 – Acleris aenigmana
3555 – Acleris lipsiana
3556 – Acleris nigrolinea
3557 – Acleris maximana
3558 – Acleris busckana
3559 – Acleris effractana, hook-winged tortrix moth
3560 – Acleris foliana
3561 – Acleris hudsoniana
3562 – Acleris incognita
3563 – Acleris capizziana
3564 – Apotoforma rotundipennis
3564.1 – Tinacrucis noroesta
3565 – Eulia ministrana, ferruginous eulia moth
3566 – Cnephasia longana, omnivorous leaftier moth
3567 – Cnephasia asseclana
3567.1 – Cnephasia stephensiana, gray tortrix moth
3568 – Eana argentana
3569 – Eana georgiella
3570 – Eana osseana, eana grass tortrix moth
3572 – Eana idahoensis
3573 – Decodes basiplagana
3574 – Decodes fragariana
3575 – Decodes montanus
3576 – Decodes lundgreni
3576.1 – Decodes catherinae
3576.2 – Decodes macswaini
3576.3 – Decodes stevensi
3577 – Decodes bicolor
3578 – Decodes johnstoni
3579 – Decodes aneuretus
3579.1 – Decodes helix
3580 – Decodes horariana
3580.1 – Decodes macdunnoughi
3580.2 – Decodes tahoense
3580.3 – Decodes asapheus
3580.4 – Decodes opleri
3580.5 – Decodes tonto
3581 – Dorithia semicirculana
3582 – Dorithia peroneana
3582.1 – Dorithia trigonana
3582.2 – Cuproxena minimana
3583 – Anopina triangulana
3584 – Anopina ednana
3584.1 – Anopina internacionana
3584.2 – Anopina hermana
3585 – Anopina eleonora
3586 – Anopina arizonana
3587 – Anopina silvertonana
3587.1 – Anopina chiricahuae
3587.2 – Anopina wrighti
3588 – Anopina ainslieana
3589 – Apotomops wellingtoniana
3589.1 – Apotomops texasana
3590 – Acroplectis haemanthes
3591 – Neoeulia dorsistriatana
3591.1 – Bonagota arizonae
3592 – Pandemis cerasana, barred fruit-tree tortrix moth
3592.1 – Pandemis heparana, dark fruit-tree tortrix moth
3593 – Pandemis lamprosana, woodgrain leafroller moth
3594 – Pandemis limitata, three-lined leafroller moth
3595 – Pandemis canadana, green aspen leaftier moth
3596 – Pandemis pyrusana, pandemis leafroller moth
3597 – Argyrotaenia velutinana, red-banded leafroller moth
3598 – Argyrotaenia montezumae
3598.1 – Argyrotaenia hodgesi
3599 – Argyrotaenia floridana
3600 – Argyrotaenia kimballi, Kimball's leafroller moth
3601 – Argyrotaenia repertana
3602 – Argyrotaenia pinatubana, pine tube moth
3603 – Argyrotaenia tabulana, jack pine tube moth
3604 – Argyrotaenia spaldingiana
3605 – Argyrotaenia gogana
3606 – Argyrotaenia amatana, pondapple leafroller moth
3607 – Argyrotaenia occultana, fall spruce needle moth
3608 – Argyrotaenia coloradanus
3609 – Argyrotaenia provana
3610 – Argyrotaenia niscana
3611 – Argyrotaenia lignitaenia
3612 – Argyrotaenia franciscana, orange tortrix moth
3613 – Argyrotaenia isolatissima
3615 – Argyrotaenia cupressae
3616 – Argyrotaenia paiuteana
3617 – Argyrotaenia burroughsi
3618 – Argyrotaenia dorsalana
3619 – Argyrotaenia lautana
3620 – Argyrotaenia klotsi
3621 – Argyrotaenia quadrifasciana, four-lined leafroller moth
3622 – Argyrotaenia juglandana, hickory leafroller moth
3623 – Argyrotaenia quercifoliana, yellow-winged oak leafroller moth
3624 – Argyrotaenia alisellana, white-spotted leafroller moth
3625 – Argyrotaenia mariana, gray-banded leafroller moth
3626 – Argyrotaenia burnsorum
3627 – Argyrotaenia ivana, ivana leafroller moth
3628 – Argyrotaenia martini
3629 – Argyrotaenia graceana
3629.1 – Argyrotaenia coconinana
3629.2 – Argyrotaenia bialbistriata
3630 – Diedra cockerellana, Cockerell's moth
3630.1 – Diedra wielgusi
3630.2 – Diedra intermontana
3630.3 – Diedra leuschneri
3630.4 – Diedra calocedrana
3631 – Choristoneura obsoletana
3632 – Choristoneura fractivittana, broken-banded leafroller moth
3633 – Choristoneura parallela, parallel-banded leafroller moth
3634 – Choristoneura zapulata, zapulata moth
3635 – Choristoneura rosaceana, oblique-banded leafroller moth
3635.1 – Choristoneura argentifasciata
3636 – Choristoneura albaniana
3637 – Choristoneura conflictana, large aspen tortrix moth
3638 – Choristoneura fumiferana, spruce budworm moth
3639 – Choristoneura retiniana
3640 – Choristoneura occidentalis, western spruce budworm moth
3640.97 – Choristoneura occidentalis complex, western spruce budworm complex
3641 – Choristoneura biennis, two-year-cycle budworm moth
3642 – Choristoneura orae
3643 – Choristoneura pinus, jack pine budworm moth
3644 – Choristoneura lambertiana
3645 – Choristoneura carnana
3646 – Choristoneura spaldingana
3647 – Cudonigera houstonana, juniper budworm moth
3648 – Archips argyrospila, fruit-tree leafroller moth
3648.1 – Archips goyerana
3648.2 – Archips nigriplagana
3649 – Archips mortuana
3650 – Archips rosana, rose tortrix moth
3651 – Archips eleagnana
3652 – Archips myricana
3653 – Archips semiferana, oak leafroller moth
3654 – Archips negundana, larger boxelder leafroller moth
3655 – Archips fervidana, oak webworm moth
3656 – Archips georgiana
3657 – Archips magnoliana
3658 – Archips purpurana, omnivorous leafroller moth
3659 – Archips infumatana, smoked leafroller moth
3660 – Archips grisea, gray archips moth
3661 – Archips cerasivorana, ugly-nest caterpillar moth
3662 – Archips rileyana, southern ugly-nest caterpillar moth
3663 – Archips oporana
3663.1 – Archips podana, large fruit-tree tortrix moth
3663.2 – Archips fuscocupreana, exotic leafroller moth
3664 – Archips strianus, striated tortrix moth
3665 – Archips alberta
3666 – Archips dissitana, boldly-marked archips moth
3667 – Archips packardiana, spring spruce needle moth
3668 – Archips tsuganus
3669 – Archepandemis borealis
3670 – Archepandemis coniferana
3671 – Archepandemis morrisana
3672 – Syndemis afflictana, gray leafroller moth
3673 – Lozotaenia hesperia
3674 – Lozotaenia rindgei
3674.1 – Lozotaenia costinotana
3674.2 – Lozotaenia exomilana
3675 – Aphelia alleniana, Allen's tortrix moth
3676 – Aphelia koebelei
3677 – Aphelia septentrionalis
3677.1 – Aphelia gregalis
3678 – Cacoecimorpha pronubana, carnation tortrix moth
3679 – Clepsis listerana
3680 – Clepsis fucana
3681 – Clepsis kearfotti
3681.1 – Clepsis spectrana
3682 – Clepsis persicana, white-triangle tortrix moth
3683 – Clepsis consimilana
3684 – Clepsis clemensiana, Clemens' clepsis moth
3685 – Clepsis moeschleriana
3685.1 – Clepsis danilevskyi
3686 – Clepsis melaleucanus, black-patched clepsis moth
3687 – Clepsis flavidana
3687.1 – Clepsis anderslaneyii
3688 – Clepsis peritana, garden tortrix moth
3688.1 – Clepsis penetralis
3689 – Clepsis virescana
3689.1 – Clepsis illustrana
3690 – Adoxophyes furcatana
3691 – Adoxophyes negundana, shimmering adoxophyes moth
3692 – Ditula angustiorana, red-barred tortrix moth
3693 – Xenotemna pallorana
3693.1 – Epiphyas postvittana, light brown apple moth
3693.2 – Unplaced retractana Walker, 1863
3694 – Niasoma metallicana
3695 – Sparganothis sulfureana, sparganothis fruitworm moth
3697 – Sparganothis lycopodiana
3697.1 – Sparganothis minimetallica
3698 – Sparganothis bistriata
3699 – Sparganothis tristriata, three-streaked sparganothis moth
3700 – Sparganothis caryae
3700.1 – Sparganothis robinsonana
3700.2 – Sparganothis tessellata
3701 – Sparganothis pulcherrimana, beautiful sparganothis moth
3702 – Sparganothis taracana
3702.1 – Sparganothis sullivani
3702.2 – Sparganothis lindalinea
3702.3 – Sparganothis mcguinnessi
3702.4 – Sparganothis azulispecca
3702.5 – Sparganothis niteolinea
3703 – Sparganothis demissana
3704 – Sparganothis distincta, distinct sparganothis moth
3705 – Sparganothis rubicundana
3706 – Sparganothis xanthoides, mosaic sparganothis moth
3706.1 – Sparganothis boweri
3707 – Cenopis daphnana
3707.1 – Cenopis unicolorana
3708 – Sparganothis salinana
3709 – Sparganothis striata
3710 – Sparganothis violaceana
3711 – Sparganothis unifasciana, one-lined sparganothis moth
3712 – Sparganothis vocaridorsana
3712.1 – Sparganothis richersi
3713 – Sparganothis tunicana
3714 – Sparganothis senecionana
3715 – Sparganothis umbrana
3715.1 – Sparganothis putmanana
3716 – Cenopis diluticostana, spring dead-leaf roller moth
3717 – Sparganothis flavibasana
3718 – Cenopis karacana
3719 – Sparganothis pilleriana, vine leafroller tortrix moth
3720 – Cenopis reticulatana, reticulated fruitworm moth
3720.1 – Cenopis ferreana
3721 – Cenopis albicaudana, white-tailed fruitworm moth
3721.1 – Cenopis eulongicosta
3722 – Cenopis directana, chokecherry leafroller moth
3723 – Cenopis chambersana
3724 – Cenopis saracana
3725 – Cenopis pettitana, maple-basswood leafroller moth
3725.1 – Cenopis lamberti
3726 – Sparganothis acerivorana, maple leafroller moth
3727 – Cenopis niveana, aproned cenopis moth
3728 – Cenopis cana, gray sparganothis moth
3728.1 – Cenopis vabroui
3728.5 – Amorbimorpha mackayiana
3729 – Sparganothoides machimiana
3730 – Sparganothoides hydeana
3731 – Sparganothoides lentiginosana, lentiginos moth
3732 – Platynota flavedana, black-shaded platynota moth
3733 – Platynota viridana
3734 – Platynota yumana
3735 – Platynota larreana
3736 – Platynota stultana
3736.1 – Platynota redingtonensis
3736.2 – Platynota zapatana
3737 – Platynota nigrocervina
3738 – Platynota labiosana
3738.1 – Platynota blanchardi
3738.2 – Platynota islameconae
3739 – Platynota calidana
3740 – Platynota idaeusalis, tufted apple budmoth
3741 – Platynota semiustana
3742 – Platynota scotiana
3743 – Platynota exasperatana, exasperating platynota moth
3744 – Platynota wenzelana
3744.1 – Platynota polingi
3744.2 – Platynota texana
3745 – Platynota rostrana, omnivorous platynota moth
3745.1 – Sparganopseustis martinana
3746 – Synnoma lynosyrana, rabbitbrush webbing moth
3746.1 – Synalocha gutierreziae
3746.2 – Syllonoma longipalpana
3747 – Coelostathma discopunctana, the Batman moth
3747.1 – Coelostathma placidana
3748 – Amorbia humerosana, white-line leafroller moth
3749 – Amorbia cuneana, western avocado leafroller moth
3749.1 – Amorbia knudsoni
3750 – Amorbia synneurana
3750.1 – Amorbia emigratella
3750.2 – Amorbia vero
3751 – Thaumatographa jonesi, psychedelic Jones moth
3752 – Thaumatographa youngiella
3753 – Thaumatographa regalis
3753.1 – Auratonota dispersa
3754 [3807] – Aethes angulatana
3754.1 [3808] – Aethes angustana
3754.2 [3809] – Aethes argentilimitana
3754.3 [3810] – Aethes atomosana
3755 – Aethes baloghi
3755.1 [3815] – Aethes biscana
3755.2 [3816] – Aethes bomonana
3755.3 [3757] – Aethes deutschiana
3756 [3754] – Aethes fernaldana
3756.1 [3822] – Aethes floccosana
3756.2 – Aethes heleniana
3756.3 [3759] – Aethes intactana
3757 [3832] – Aethes interruptofasciata
3757.1 [3756] – Aethes kindermanniana
3757.2 [3837] – Aethes louisiana
3757.3 – Aethes matheri
3758 – Aethes matthewcruzi
3758.1 – Aethes monera
3758.2 – Aethes mymara
3758.3 [3841] – Aethes obliquana
3759 – Aethes patricia
3759.1 [3844] – Aethes promptana
3759.2 [3846] – Aethes rana
3759.3 – Aethes razowskii, Razowski's aethes moth
3760 [3758] – Aethes rutilana
3760.1 [3850] – Aethes seriatana, seriated aethes moth
3760.2 – Aethes sexdentata
3760.3 [3755] – Aethes smeathmanniana, Smeathmann's aethes moth
3761 – Aethes sonorae, streaked aethes moth
3761.1 [3851] – Aethes spartinana
3761.2 – Aethes terriae
3761.3 [3856] – Aethes vachelliana
3761.4 – Aethes westratei
3762 – Agapeta zoegana, knapweed root-borer moth
3763 [3783] – Carolella bimaculana, two-spotted carolella moth
3764 [3782] – Carolella sartana, broad-patch carolella moth
3765 – Cochylidia subroseana
3766 – Cochylis arthuri
3767 [3812] – Cochylis aurorana
3768 – Cochylis avita
3769 – Cochylis bucera
3770 [3817] – Cochylis carmelana
3771 – Cochylis caulocatax
3772 – Cochylis disputabilis
3773 – Cochylis dormitoria
3774 – Cochylis dubitana
3775 [3767] – Cochylis formonana
3776 [3828] – Cochylis hoffmanana, Hoffman's cochlid moth
3777 [3830] – Cochylis hospes
3778 [3764] – Cochylis nana
3779 [3761] – Cochylis parallelana
3780 – Cochylis ringsi, Rings' cochylid moth
3781 [3854] – Cochylis temerana
3782 [3762] – Cochylis transversana
3783 [3857] – Cochylis viscana
3784 [3788] – Eugnosta argyroplaca
3785 [3789] – Eugnosta beevorana
3786 [3790] – Eugnosta busckana
3787 – Eugnosta californica
3788 – Eugnosta chemsakiana
3789 [3785] – Eugnosta deceptana
3790 [3784] – Eugnosta erigeronana, fleabane cochylid moth
3791 [3786] – Eugnosta mexicana
3792 [3791] – Eugnosta willettana
no number yet Eupinivora ponderosae
3793 [3847] – Gynidomorpha romonana
3794 – Henricus cognata
3795 [3778] – Henricus comes
3796 [3774] – Henricus contrastana, contrasting henricus moth
3797 [3820] – Henricus edwardsiana
3798 [3773] – Henricus fuscodorsana, cone cochylid moth
3799 [3771] – Henricus infernalis
3800 [3770] – Henricus macrocarpana
3801 [3777] – Henricus umbrabasana
3802 – Lorita baccharivora
3803 – Lorita scarificata, chrysanthemum flower borer moth
3804 [3814] – Phalonidia basiochreana
3805 [3821] – Phalonidia elderana
3806 [3779] – Phalonidia latipunctana
3807 [3856] – Phalonidia lepidana
3808 – Phalonidia memoranda
3809 – Phalonidia ontariana
3810 [3793] – Phtheochroa aegrana
3811 [3794] – Phtheochroa aureoalbida
3812 [3804] – Phtheochroa baracana
3813 [3801] – Phtheochroa birdana
3814 [3798] – Phtheochroa cartwrightana
3815 [3792] – Phtheochroa fulviplicana
3816 – Phtheochroa hamartopenis
3817 [3776] – Phtheochroa huachucana
3818 – Phtheochroa inopiana
3819 [3805] – Phtheochroa modestana, modest phtheochroa moth
3820 [3803] – Phtheochroa pecosana
3821 [3800] – Phtheochroa perspicuana
3822 [3802] – Phtheochroa riscana
3823 [3799] – Phtheochroa terminana
3824 [3797] – Phtheochroa villana
3825 [3787] – Phtheochroa vitellinana
3826 – Phtheochroa vulneratana
3827 [3796] – Phtheochroa waracana
3828 – Platphalonidia albertae
3829 [3765] – Platphalonidia campicolana
3830 – Platphalonidia dangi
3831 [3760] – Platphalonidia felix
3832 – Platphalonidia imitabilis
3833 [3834] – Platphalonidia lavana
3834 [3766] – Platphalonidia parvimaculana
3835 – Platphalonidia plicana
3836 – Rolandylis fusca
3837 [3838] – Rolandylis maiana, Kearfott's rolandylis moth
3838 – Rolandylis virilia
3839 [3835] – Rudenia leguminana, black-tipped rudenia moth
3840 [3840] – Saphenista nomonana
3841 [3780] – Saphenista saxicolana
3842 – Spinipogon resthavenensis
3843 [3775] – Thyraylia bana
3844 [3769] – Thyraylia bunteana
3845 [3819] – Thyraylia discana
3846 [3827] – Thyraylia gunniana
3847 [3829] – Thyraylia hollandana, Holland's cochylid moth
3848 [3842] – Atroposia oenotherana, primrose cochylid moth
3849 [3818] – Cagiva cephalanthana
3850 [3831] – Cybilla hubbardana
3851 [3826] – Honca grandis
3852 [3763] – Nycthia pimana
3853 [3860] – Nycthia yuccatana
3854 [3859] – Poterioparvus wiscana
3855 [3813] – Unplaced baboquivariana (Kearfott, 1907)
3856 [3768] – Unplaced dilutana Walsingham, 1879
3857 [3823] – Unplaced foxcana (Kearfott, 1907)
3858 [3824] – Unplaced fulvotinctana (Walsingham, 1884)
3859 [3825] – Unplaced glaucofuscana (Zeller, 1875)
3860 [3845] – Unplaced punctadiscana (Kearfott, 1908)
3861 [3862] – Unplaced ziscana (Kearfott, 1907)

See also
List of butterflies of North America
List of Lepidoptera of Hawaii
List of moths of Canada
List of butterflies of Canada

External links
Checklists of North American Moths

Moths of North America
North America